Shanghai Supercomputer Center (SSC) offers high performance computing (HPC), technical support and technical consulting services to customers from scientific research, public utilities services, and industrials and engineering. It was founded in December 2000 with an investment by the Shanghai Municipal Government. SSC has over 350 users from 27 provinces across China, and covers 20 different fields and industries, which include weather forecast, drug design, life science, auto design, new material, civil engineering, physics, chemistry, and aerospace.

During the past decade, SSC has introduced three HPC systems, two of which were ranked #10 in TOP500 list in 2004 and 2009 separately: DAWNING 4000A (10TFlops) and DAWNING 5000A (Magic Cube, 230TFlops).

See also

Dawning Information Industry
Computing platform
Supercomputer centers in China

References

External links
 

Economy of Shanghai
Supercomputer sites
Computer science institutes in China
Science and technology in China
Supercomputing in China
2000 establishments in China